The Larkins may refer to:
 The Larkins (1958 TV series), a British TV comedy series broadcast between 1958 and 1964
 The Larkins (2021 TV series), a British TV comedy drama that started broadcasting in 2021
 the family which is the subject of The Darling Buds of May (novel) (1958) and its sequels